Babul Kumar (born 12 January 1993) is an Indian cricketer. He made his List A debut for Bihar in the 2018–19 Vijay Hazare Trophy on 19 September 2018, scoring 121 not out. He was the leading run-scorer for Bihar in the tournament, with 419 runs in eight matches. He made his Twenty20 debut for Bihar in the 2018–19 Syed Mushtaq Ali Trophy on 22 February 2019.

References

External links
 

1993 births
Living people
Indian cricketers
Bihar cricketers
Jharkhand cricketers
Place of birth missing (living people)